Gardenia kakaduensis is a species of plant in the family Rubiaceae native to northern Australia.

References

kakaduensis
Plants described in 1997
Flora of Australia
Taxa named by Christopher Francis Puttock